Ana or ANA may refer to:

People
 Ana (given name), a list of people with the name
 Ana people or Atakpame people, an ethnic group of West Africa
 ana (gamer), Anathan Pham, an Australian professional Dota 2 player known as ana

Places
 Ana, Kohgiluyeh and Boyer-Ahmad, village in Iran
 Ana or Anah, town in Iraq
 Ana, populated place in Morobe Province, Papua New Guinea
 Ana or Anié, town in Togo

Arts and entertainment
 Ana (1982 film), a Portuguese film
 Ana (2020 film), an American film
 The Hole (1957 film) or Ana, a 1957 Japanese film
 Ana (1984 TV series), a Pakistani drama on PTV
 Ana (2004 TV series), a Pakistani drama on Geo TV
 Ana (2020 TV series), a Mexican comedy show
 ana (2021 TV series), Syrian TV series starring Taim Hasan
 "Ana", a song by the Pixies from Bossanova
 Ana (Ralph Towner album), 1996
 Ana (Ana album), 1987
 Ana (Overwatch), a player character in the video games Overwatch and Heroes of the Storm
 Ana (Mother), a character in the original Mother video game

Businesses
 , a Swedish auto manufacturer
 African News Agency, 
 All Nippon Airways, a Japanese airline
 Athens News Agency, the national news agency of Greece
 Australian National Airways, a defunct airline

Organizations

Military
 Afghan National Army
 Albanian National Army

Other organizations
 Administration for Native Americans, a program in the Administration for Children and Families
 Agency for New Americans, a refugee organization in Boise, Idaho
 , the Brazilian National Water Agency
 Alliance for Nuclear Accountability, a network of organizations collaborating on issues of nuclear weapons production and waste cleanup
 American Numismatic Association
 American Nurses Association
 , an airport authority
 Association of National Advertisers
 Association of Naval Aviation, one of the sponsors of the Wesley L. McDonald Leadership Award
 , the Italian National Alpini Association
 Australian National Alliance, a far-right political party active from 1978 to 1981
 Australian Natives' Association, a white Australian organisation founded in 1871

Science and technology
 Anti-nuclear antibody, an autoantibody that binds to contents of the cell nucleus
 Ana (mathematics), a name proposed for a direction in the fourth spatial dimension
 Ana (programming language)
 Anorexia nervosa or ana
 Anandamide, a neurotransmitter

Other uses
 Anaheim Ducks, a National Hockey League team; based in Anaheim, California, US
 Ana River, river in Oregon, US
 -ana, a Latinate suffix to form a mass noun
 List of storms named Ana, tropical and extratropical storms named Ana
 Ana tree, a hardwood tree native to Africa and the Middle East
 Ana (search dog) (1995–2008)
 Autonomic Network Architecture, a project of the European Union
 ANA (motorcycle), Australian motorcycle
 Authorised Neutral Athletes, Russian athletes who can compete at international athletic competitions after the doping scandal
 Anaheim Regional Transportation Intermodal Center (in California, USA) (Amtrak code "ANA")

See also
 Ak Ana, a god in Mongol mythology
 Anna (disambiguation)